Mayo Building or Mayo Hall may refer to:

in India
Mayo Hall (Bangalore), a historic building

in the United States
Mayo Building (Rochester, Minnesota), in Minnesota, a modern complex
Plummer Building, Rochester, Minnesota, also known as Mayo Clinic Building
Mayo Building (Tulsa, Oklahoma), listed on the NRHP in Tulsa County, Oklahoma
Mayo Hall (Commerce, Texas), listed on the U.S. National Register of Historic Places
Mayo Building (Northfield, Vermont), listed on the NRHP in Washington County, Vermont

See also
Mayo Hotel, Tulsa, Oklahoma, NRHP-listed
Mayo House (disambiguation)

Architectural disambiguation pages